Sphenopholis obtusata is a species of grass known by the common names prairie wedgescale and prairie wedge grass. It is native to North America where it is widespread across southern Canada and the United States. It occurs in many types of habitat, including prairie, marshes, dunes, and disturbed areas.

Description
Sphenopholis obtusata is a perennial bunchgrass growing 20 centimeters to well over one meter in maximum height. The short leaves have ligules with jagged tips. The inflorescence is generally a dense, spikelike panicle of oval-shaped spikelets. The inflorescence is greenish white, darkening brownish as it matures.

References

External links
Jepson Manual Treatment
USDA Plants Profile
Grass Manual Treatment
Illinois Wildflowers
Photo gallery

Pooideae
Bunchgrasses of North America
Grasses of the United States
Grasses of Canada
Native grasses of California
Flora of the Sierra Nevada (United States)
Natural history of the California chaparral and woodlands
Natural history of the Peninsular Ranges
Flora without expected TNC conservation status